Allá en el trópico is a 1940 Mexican comedy musical film directed by Fernando de Fuentes and starring Tito Guízar, Esther Fernández and Carlos López.

Cast

Tito Guízar: José Juan García
Esther Fernández: Esperanza
Carlos López: Perico
Sara García: Doña Panchita
René Cardona :Felipe Cervantes

External links
 

1940 films
1940s Spanish-language films
1940 musical comedy films
Films directed by Fernando de Fuentes
Mexican black-and-white films
Mexican musical comedy films
1940s Mexican films